Autographa labrosa is a species of looper moth in the family Noctuidae.  It is found in North America.

The MONA or Hodges number for Autographa labrosa is 8920.

References

Further reading

 

Plusiini
Moths described in 1875